The following is a chronicle of events during the year 1987 in ice hockey.

National Hockey League
Art Ross Trophy as the NHL's leading scorer during the regular season: Wayne Gretzky  ]  
Hart Memorial Trophy: for the NHL's Most Valuable Player:  Wayne Gretzky
Stanley Cup -  the Edmonton Oilers defeat the Philadelphia Flyers 1987 Stanley Cup Finals
With the first overall pick in the 1987 NHL Amateur Draft, the Buffalo Sabres select Pierre Turgeon

Canadian Hockey League
Ontario Hockey League:  J. Ross Robertson Cup.
Quebec Major Junior Hockey League:  won President's Cup (QMJHL) for the first time in team history
Western Hockey League:   President's Cup (WHL) for the first time in team history
Memorial Cup:

International hockey

Canada Cup

World Hockey Championship

European hockey

Minor League hockey
AHL:   Calder Cup
IHL:   Turner Cup.
 Allan Cup: the Brantford Mott's Clamatos

Junior A hockey

University hockey
 NCAA Division I Men's Ice Hockey Tournament

*the Plattsburgh State Cardinals won the NCAA Division III men's ice hockey tournament

*Tony Hrkac won the Hobey Baker Award

*

Deaths

Season articles

See also
1987 in sports

References